The year 1703 in science and technology involved some significant events.

Biology
 Charles Plumier's Nova plantarum Americanarum genera begins publication in Paris. This includes descriptions of Fuchsia, discovered by him on Hispaniola, and naming of the genus Magnolia, applied to species from Martinique.

Chemistry
 Georg Ernst Stahl, professor of medicine and chemistry at the University of Halle, proposes phlogiston theory in the way it comes to be generally understood.

Mathematics
 Gottfried Leibniz first publishes a description of binary numbers in the West.
 Leonty Magnitsky's Arithmetic (Арифметика) is published, a scientific book in the Russian language.

Meteorology
 November 24 – December 2 – The Great Storm of 1703, an Atlantic hurricane, ravages southern England and the English Channel, killing nearly 8000, mostly at sea.

Technology
 An early, crude seismograph is developed by the French physicist Abbé Jean de Hautefeuille.

Appointments
 November 30 – Isaac Newton is elected president of the Royal Society in London, a position he will hold until his death in 1727.

Births
 January 8 – André Levret, French obstetrician (died 1780)
 January 15 – Johann Ernst Hebenstreit, German physician and naturalist (died 1757)
 June 21 – Joseph Lieutaud, French physician (died 1780)
 August 23 – Robert James, English physician (died 1776)
 September 15 – Guillaume-François Rouelle, French chemist and apothecary (died 1770) 
 October 28 – Antoine Deparcieux, French mathematician (died 1768)
 November 25 – Jean-François Séguier, French astronomer and botanist (died 1784)
 December 2 – Ferdinand Konščak, Croatian explorer (died 1759)
 December 9 – Chester Moore Hall, English scientific instrument maker (died 1771)
 December 24 – Aleksei Chirikov, Russian explorer (died 1748)

Deaths
 March 3 – Robert Hooke, English scientist (born 1635)
 March 20 (probable) – Johann von Löwenstern-Kunckel, German chemist (born 1630?)
 September 22 – Vincenzo Viviani, Italian mathematician and scientist (born 1622)
 October 28 – John Wallis, English mathematician (born 1616)

References

 
18th century in science
1700s in science